The Nuance Party is a political party in Sweden founded in 2019. According to national broadcaster Sveriges Television (SVT), the party aims mainly at the country's Muslim population.

History 
The Nuance Party was founded in August 2019 by Mikail Yüksel, a Turkish-born politician who had been expelled from the Centre Party for alleged links to the Turkish ultranationalist group the Grey Wolves. In his founding statement, he said that Islamophobia should be a criminal offence, and that Sweden's Muslims should have a constitutional definition as a minority. The party was officially launched in September 2019 and registered with Sweden's Election Authority on 31 October 2019 to contest the 2022 Swedish general election, as well as the 2024 European Parliament election in Sweden.

Dagens Nyheter, Sweden's newspaper of record, reported in July 2022 that one in every seven of the party's electoral candidates was a convicted criminal. One of these, Bashir Aman Ali, received a 4.5-year prison sentence for financial crime, having used 10 million Swedish krona from an educational organisation to start an Islamic bank; he was accused by politicians from other parties of spreading conspiracy theories during the campaign, as he falsely claimed that Sweden can imprison Muslims for up to a year without trial or evidence. 

In August 2022, Scania newspapers Helsingborgs Dagblad and Sydsvenskan found that five of Nuance's 25 candidates in the county had spread hate speech about Jews and Shia Muslims, COVID-19 misinformation, or 9/11 conspiracy theories. Three of the candidates were expelled due to the findings.

Platform 
The Nuance Party accuses Swedish social services of forcing Muslim children into foster care and assimilation, accusations which have been picked up by foreign broadcasters including TRT World and Al Jazeera and rejected as false in Sweden. The party supports criminalising Quran desecration, such as the public burnings by activist Rasmus Paludan that preceded the 2022 Sweden riots that April.

The party put up a billboard in Kulu, Konya, the place of origin of most of Sweden's Turks, including Yüksel. The billboard described it as "the only Turkey-friendly party that distances itself from terrorist organisations". Sofie Blombäck, a political scientist from Mid Sweden University, said that the party was unusual in that religious-based parties are rare in Sweden; the Christian Democrats is a party smaller than in other nations. Blombäck compared the Nuance Party to DENK, a minority-focused party in the Netherlands, and said that while it could possibly enter local politics in Malmö, it was unlikely to enter the Riksdag.

Party goals 
These are some of the party goals listed on the Nuance Party's official website:

 Abolish employment fees for new immigrants and people under the age of 25
 Anonymous application for rental homes
 Compulsory Swedish-language education for new immigrants
 Criminalize Bosnian genocide denial
 Fight racism
 Increase government funding of religious organizations
 Race-based affirmative action in both public and private job sectors
 Reduce VAT rates by 50%
 Recognize Muslims and blacks as official minority groups
 Sanction countries that do not take in refugees
 Sanction Israel and create a Palestinian state
 The right to receive news from authorities in foreign languages

Results 
In the 2022 Swedish general election, the Nuance Party came ninth with 0.44% of the vote, the highest of any party that did not enter parliament. The party claimed 2.1% of the vote in Malmö, 1.14% in Gothenburg and 0.76% in Stockholm. Some analysts have seen the rise of the Nuance Party as one of the causes of the losses in the left bloc.

The party received 2.44% of the votes in Landskrona Municipality election, and 2.03% of the votes in Botkyrka Municipality, putting them above the 2% minimum needed for a seat on the councils.

See also 
 Ethnic party
 Identity politics
 Islamophobia in Sweden
 List of political parties in Sweden

References 

2019 establishments in Sweden
Anti-racism in Sweden
Anti-Zionism in Sweden
Identity politics
Islam in Sweden
Islamic organizations based in Sweden
Islamism in Sweden
Middle Eastern diaspora in Sweden
Minor political parties in Sweden
Minority rights
Multiculturalism in Europe
Political parties established in 2019
Political parties of minorities
Turkish diaspora in Europe
Turkish political parties